Wei Christianson (née Sun; born August 21, 1956) is a Chinese-American businesswoman and lawyer who is the CEO of Morgan Stanley's China operations and Co-CEO of its Asia Pacific division. She is also a member of its management committee.

Early life and education

Wei Sun Christianson was born on 21 August 1956 to an People's Liberation Army officer father and doctor mother as part of the Frontier Generation from China's Cultural Revolution.  She grew up in Beijing as the youngest of four daughters.  Growing up, her mother would often sew clothes that were "just a bit more stylish than what was generally available", stimulating Christianson's early interests in fashion.  Her parents believed strongly in a Western education, going as far as to spend a month's salary buying her a tape recorder so she could play English tapes.  She took the Gao Kao in 1978 and was accepted by the prestigious Beijing Language and Culture University, with the intention of learning English and working as a translator for the Ministry of Foreign Affairs.

Encouraged by her Columbia University professor Randle Edwards, Christianson applied to a dozen liberal arts colleges in the United States.  In 1983 she transferred to Amherst College and became its first student from mainland China to study in the United States following China's re-opening to the Western world in the early 1980s. She graduated cum laude with a B.A. in political science in 1985.

She immediately continued on to Columbia Law School, received her J.D. degree in international law in 1989, and met her future husband Jon Christianson

Career

Following Columbia Law School, Wei Christianson worked as an attorney in the New York offices of Orrick, Herrington & Sutcliffe.

In 1992, Christianson and her husband moved to Hong Kong for his job.  In order to raise a child (as continuing her law profession in Hong Kong would require her to travel), she attained a position as Associate Director in the Corporate Finance Department at the Hong Kong Securities and Futures Commission (SFC) drafting the regulatory structure that would enable the first batch of People's Republic of China companies to be listed outside China — a unique job that helped pave the way for her investment banking career.  However, Christianson's husband felt that a career as a regulator did not fully meet Christianson's potential, and suggested pursuing a job in finance instead.

Christianson soon joined Morgan Stanley in 1998, where she was an executive director, Beijing chief representative, and a senior team member of its Resources, Power and Transportation Group, where she met her mentor John Mack. When Mack was ousted from Morgan Stanley in 2002, Christianson followed him to Credit Suisse First Boston, where he held positions as a managing director, chairman, and country manager.  After that, Christianson joined Citigroup as a managing director and chairman of China, Citigroup Global Markets (Asia) Ltd., where she was responsible for the securities and investment banking businesses in China.  Christianson returned to Morgan Stanley once again, under Mack's request, in 2006 as the chief executive officer for China, and retains her position there to the present day.  Since her return, Christianson has built out the Morgan Stanley team by 300% and played a critical role in many significant deals for the firm, such as the 2007 $5 billion sale of Morgan Stanley's stakes to China's state-owned China Investment Corporation.

Christianson led major initial public offerings including Sinopec, China Life, and SMIC, and oversaw the $4.2 billion acquisition of Gas Kazakhstan by CNPC, which was considered as a large cross-border M&A deal in China at that time.

In addition, Christianson is a member of the advisory committee to Hong Kong Securities and Futures Commission (SFC), a member of the advisory board of China Shenzhen Stock Exchange, a board member of the Estée Lauder Companies, a member of the Columbia University International Advisory Board of Law School, a member of Yale Asia Development Council, on the Amherst College Board of Trustees and a member of Hong Kong’s Financial Services Development Council (HKFSDC).

Canadian prime minister Justin Trudeau held a public meeting with Christianson in Toronto to discuss Asia-Canada business relations at the height of global trade tensions in 2018.

Philanthropic and sustainability initiatives 

Christianson has been engaged in many philanthropic and sustainability initiatives, including being a keynote speaker at the 2017 UN Women/CKGSB Women in leadership forum, supporting the Morgan Stanley Women Business Alliance (WBA) in Asia Pacific and Morgan Stanley’s Global Sustainability Bond Leadership Council in Asia Pacific. Over the years, she has supported a number of Morgan Stanley’s core charities namely Heart to Heart, Little Flower and Jiutian school and has volunteered at the Beijing Children’s Hospital (BCH) since 2009.

Awards 

Ms. Christianson has been named in Fortune Magazine’s Most Powerful Women (MPW) “International list” for 11th consecutive years since 2008. She was one of the Financial Times’ twelve “Women of 2013” and FinanceAsia magazine’s Top 25 Women in Asian Finance in 2015. She has also regularly appeared on Fortune Magazine’s “China Powerful Women” and Forbes’ “Businesswomen in China” lists.

She was listed in the Financial Times’ 2010 and 2011 "Power Women to Watch" lists, as well as being on the Wall Street Journal’s 2006, 2007 and 2008 “50 Women to Watch” list. She has also been rated as one of the Top 25 Non-bank Women in Finance by the American Banker and US Banker Association in 2007 and 2008.

Christianson received the 2009 Pinnacle Award from the Asian American Business Development Center for being one of the Outstanding 50 Asian Americans in Business, the 2008 Legacy Award from the Museum of Chinese in America, and the 2008 China Women's Achievement Award from the Women's Federation of P.R. China and Sun Media Group.

Christianson has been awarded the Medal for Excellence by Columbia University School of Law Association.

Personal life
Christianson is famously tight-lipped during interviews, declining to give information on on-going company projects.

She is also known to be well-dressed at all times and has dabbled in design, participating in the 2015 Women Fashion Power exhibit at the Design Museum in London.  She gave an interview with the museum detailing her fashion and beauty habits in which she states that she does not have a personal shopper, and does most of her shopping herself spontaneously while traveling around the world for work.

Christianson has stated in multiple interviews that her mother was a major influence growing up. She states that her late mother was the one to support her staying in such a male-dominated field even when Christianson felt like giving up.  Her mother also spurred on her interests in fashion by tailoring her daughters' clothing and "modestly challenging the Chinese system".

She is married to American Jon Christianson, a former partner of Skadden, Arps, Slate, Meagher & Flom LLP, and Affiliates.  She has stated that she and her husband split equal responsibilities and support each other in their work and in raising their children, compensating at home for each other's busy work hours.  She is also the mother of three boys: Erik, Neil, and Nicholas.  She currently lives with her family in Beijing.

References

1956 births
Living people
Amherst College alumni
Columbia Law School alumni
American people of Chinese descent
Members of Committee of 100
Morgan Stanley people
Women corporate executives
Women in finance
Businesspeople from Beijing
Chinese women chief executives
20th-century Chinese businesswomen
20th-century Chinese businesspeople
21st-century Chinese businesswomen
21st-century Chinese businesspeople
Orrick, Herrington & Sutcliffe people